Bar Aftab-e Rezai (also Romanized as Bar Āftāb-e Reẕā’ī; also known as Bar Āftāb-e Bozorg) is a village in Donbaleh Rud-e Jonubi Rural District, Dehdez District, Izeh County, Khuzestan Province, Iran. At the 2006 census, its population was 155, in 27 families.

References 

Populated places in Izeh County